Rospiggarna is a motorcycle speedway team based in Hallstavik, Sweden. They ride in the Elitserien are five times champions of Sweden.

History
The club was founded in 1930 and were named Orion, although it did not compete in the Swedish speedway leagues until 1966. The club joined the Swedish Division Three in 1966 and the team name was changed to Stjärnorna (English: The Stars). In 1978, the name was changed again to Rospiggarna which is the demonym for people from Roslagen, where Hallstavik is situated.

Rospiggarna won four Swedish Speedway Team Championships from 1995 to 2002 and has also been the home team of four former World Champions, Tony Rickardsson, Per Jonsson, Greg Hancock and Jason Crump. 

In 2010, it was announced that the club voluntarily made the decision to drop down a division to the Allsvenskan due to financial problems. In 2014, the club returned to the Elitserien and two years later in 2016 they won their fifth Swedish team Championship.

Season summary

Teams

2023 team

Previous teams

2016 team

 
 
 
 
 
 
 

2021 team

 
 
 
 
 
 
 
 
 
 
 
Coach
 

2022 team

References

Swedish speedway teams
Sport in Stockholm County